Dreamcatcher is a 2021 horror film written and directed by Jacob Johnson.

Synopsis
Two sisters must deal with a homicidal serial killer on the rampage at a nightclub.

Cast
 Niki Koss as Pierce
 Zachary Gordon as Jake
 Travis Burns as Dylan 'DJ Dreamcatcher'
 Blaine Kern III as Hunter
 Olivia Sui as Raye
 Emrhys Cooper as Brecken
 Elizabeth Posey as Ivy
 Adrienne Wilkinson as Josephine
 Lou Ferrigno Jr. as Colton
 Nazanin Mandi as Kya
 Ryan Powers as DJ Dreamcatcher
 Al Calderon as Zeke the Stagehand
 Ben J. Pierce as Scott

Development
Johnson has stated that films such as Suspiria, The Night of the Hunter, and The Neon Demon were a big influence on Dreamcatcher. Alexander Taylor was brought on to create the score and actors Niki Koss, Zachary Gordon, and Travis Burns were confirmed as performing in the film.

Release
Dreamcatcher was released on VOD on March 5, 2021 through Samuel Goldwyn Films.

Reception
Dreamcatcher has a rating of 40% on Rotten Tomatoes, based on 10 reviews.

The film's criticism mostly centered on the plot, which Dread Central and Common Sense Media felt offered nothing new to the genre: a reviewer for Film Threat criticized the script, highlighting "Johnston's stilted, inconsequential dialogue", while Starburst felt that the film was convoluted.

References

External links
 

2021 films
2021 horror films
2021 thriller films
American horror films
2020s English-language films
2020s American films